The Ligue de Football Professionnel (Professional Football League), commonly known as the LFP, is a French governing body that runs the major professional football leagues in France. It was founded in 1944 and serves under the authority of the French Football Federation. The current president of the league is Vincent Labrune. It is headquartered in Paris.

The league is responsible for overseeing, organizing, and managing the top two leagues in France, Ligue 1 and Ligue 2, and is also responsible for the 44 professional football clubs that contest football in France (20 in Ligue 1, 20 in Ligue 2, and four in the Championnat National).

Foundation
The history of the Ligue de Football Professionnel dates back before World War II when the committee's primary motive was to ensure clubs in France pay players their wages. The chairman of the early predecessor of the league was Emmanuel Gambardella. Another committee, which monitored professional clubs and the status of professional players also existed during this time and was headed by Gabriel Hanot, who was later responsible for the creation of the European Cup, now the UEFA Champions League. During the Vichy regime, professionalism in France was abolished, which led to clubs forming unpopular regional amateur leagues. Under the current LFP hierarchy, the years 1939–1945 are non-existent.

Following the conclusion of the war, many clubs were hesitant to follow the initiatives of the French Football Federation due to their belief that the federation were not thinking in their best interests and, instead, opted to join an initiative by Gambardella referred the Groupement des clubs autorisés. On 27 October 1944, the Ligue Nationale de Football (National Football League) was officially founded with Gambardella being installed as the organization's first president. The league changed its name back to Groupement des clubs autorisés shortly after and kept the name until 1970 before returning to Ligue Nationale de Football. In 2000, the league changed its name to the Ligue de Football Professionnel.

Mission
The Ligue de Football Professionnel describes itself through its mission statement. The LFP must:

 Organize, manage, and regulate all the aspects of professional football in France.
 Finance all operations or any actions that are likely to develop the resources of professional football in France.
 Apply the sanctions imposed by its authority organizations vis-à-vis members of sports clubs and its licenses and any other person bounded by these articles.
 To defend the moral and material interests of French football in France.

Competition

League
The 44 member clubs of the LFP are grouped into two divisions: Ligue 1 (20 clubs) and Ligue 2 (20 clubs). The LFP also oversee the professional clubs that suffer relegation to third-tier Championnat National. Currently, there are four clubs playing in the third division that the league manages. In any given season a club plays each of the others in the same division twice, once at their home stadium and once at that of their opponents, though special circumstances may allow a club to host matches at other venues such as when Lille hosted Lyon at the Stade de France in 2007 and 2008. This makes for a total of 38 games played each season in both leagues.

Clubs gain three points for a win, one for a draw, and none for a defeat. At the end of each season, the club with the most points in Ligue 1 is crowned champion of France. Teams are ranked by total points, then goal difference, and then goals scored. If points are equal, the goal difference and then goals scored determine the winner. If still equal, teams are deemed to occupy the same position. If there is a tie for the championship, for relegation, or for qualification to other competitions, a play-off match at a neutral venue decides rank. The three lowest placed teams are relegated to Ligue 2 and the top three teams from Ligue 2 are promoted in their place.

Cup
The LFP also organizes a cup competition, the Coupe de la Ligue. Before its foundation as an official league cup in 1994, the competition was a summer friendly tournament. Unlike the Coupe de France which allows all clubs, regardless of status, to enter, the Coupe de la Ligue only allows professional clubs to participate. The competition is considered second-rate compared to the Coupe de France and attracts much criticism from many who deem the cup as having less prestige and creating fixture congestion.

DNCG

The DNCG is the organisation responsible for monitoring the accounts of professional association football clubs in France. It was founded in 1984 and is an administrative directorate of the LFP. The current president of the DNCG is Richard Olivier. Along with the LFP, the DNCG has a public mission of service. The mission of the DNCG is to oversee all financial operations of the 40 member clubs of the LFP (as well as those clubs recently relegated to the Championnat National), develop the resources of professional clubs, apply sanctions to those clubs breaking the rules of operation and to defend the morals and interests of French football in general.

Presidents
Since the LFP's foundation, there have been a total of nine presidents who have served. The first president of the league was Emmanuel Gambardella who ran the organization from 1944 to 1953. His positive influence on French football led to the French Football Federation naming the country's prestigious under-19 youth cup tournament after him.  The current president is Nathalie Boy de la Tour who was elected in 2016, becoming the first woman to take the role.

Presidents in italics served in an interim role.

References

External links
Official LFP site 
Official LFP site 

Football governing bodies in France
Ligue 1
Ligue 2
1944 establishments in France
Sports organizations established in 1944